Gnorimoschema crypticum is a moth in the family Gelechiidae. It was described by Powell and Povolný in 2001. It is found in North America, where it has been recorded from California and Wyoming.

The length of the forewings is 6.2-7.75 mm for males and 5.4-7.75 mm for females. The ground colour of the forewings varies from chocolate to pale rust-brown, nearly uniform or with the dorsal margin pale brownish to cream coloured. There is a variable pale pattern, usually consisting of poorly defined, transverse markings and a subterminal band on diffuse, dark brown areas and blackish strigulae. The hindwings are dark grey with blackish veins, paler basally. Adults are on wing from July to October.

The larvae feed on Haplopappus squarrosa, Haplopappus menziesii var. vernonioides and Haplopappus acradenia. They create soft galls which vary in form. Pupation takes place in cocoons made in ground litter or in the soil.

References

Gnorimoschema
Moths described in 2001